Maghery Sean MacDermott's GAC is a Gaelic Athletic Association (GAA) club from Maghery, County Armagh, Northern Ireland. The club's home ground is Felix Hamill Park which opened in 2003 (formerly St Mary's GAA Park, opened 1956)

History 

The club was founded in 1906 and plays in blue with a gold hoop. The club fields football teams at senior, u-21, minor, u-16, u-14, u-12 u-10, u-8 and u-6 levels.

Maghery Sean MacDermott's GAC won their first Armagh Senior Football Championship on 16 October 2016 beating St. Patrick's Cullyhanna at the Athletic Grounds in Armagh.

Football titles

Armagh Senior Football Championship (2)
2016, 2020
Armagh Intermediate Football Championship (1)
2003
Armagh Junior Football Championship (3)
1937, 1958, 1961
Armagh Under 21 Football Championship (1)
1982
Armagh Minor Football Championship (3)
1974, 1978, 1988
Armagh Minor League (1)
1988
Armagh All County League Division 1 (7)
1970, 1982, 1987, 1993, 2012, 2013,2019
Armagh All County League Division 2 (1)
2004
North Armagh Football Championship (1)
1989

Key players
Tomas Tomahawk Toye

Facilities

The home ground of Maghery GAC is Felix Hamill Park. It was officially opened on Sunday 13 April 2003. Prior to this the ground was known as St Mary's GAA Park (opened 1956).

The first match to be played on Felix Hamill Park was between Armagh and Westmeath and took place on Sunday 16 March 2003. The official opening took place on Sunday 13 April 2003 with a blessing by Most Reverend Sean Brady Archbishop of Armagh. Other guests at the official opening were: Sean Kelly (GAA President), John O'Reilly (Ulster GAA President), Peter Quinn (Former GAA President), Joe Jordan (Armagh County Board)

As well as hosting all home games of all Maghery GAC teams, Felix Hamill Park also hosts Armagh club championship games and Ulster Colleges games.

Felix Hamill park is located on Derrywarragh Island and is flanked along its south side by Maghery Canal and along its west side by the River Blackwater.

References

External links
 http://www.maghery.com

Gaelic games clubs in County Armagh
Gaelic football clubs in County Armagh